Claude Rijmenans (born November 10, 1948) is a Belgian ambassador.

Early life
Rijmenans was born in Rome, Italy on November 10, 1948. Rijmenans is the son of H.E. Marcel Rijmenans, ambassador of H.M. the King of the Belgians. He performed his primary and high school education in Belgium, the United States (San Francisco, California) and in the Federal Republic of Germany (Bonn), and graduated in social sciences from the Free University of Brussels (1972).

Personal life 

He is married and has two sons. His wife, Katija Rijmenans and is 2 years younger than him.

Career 

Rijmenans was a reserve officer in the Royal Belgian Air Force from 1973–1974. He was sworn into the Diplomatic Service on January 1, 1977. Ambassador Claude Rijmenans was promoted to the rank of Minister Plenipotentiary on January 1, 1994. On March 1, 2006 he was promoted to the first class, the Belgian equivalent of full ambassadorial rank.

He retired on December 1, 2013, at the mandatory age of 65. By Royal Decree, he retains the honour of his ambassadorial rank.

Ambassadorial postings
1976–1980: Bangkok (Second Secretary)
1980–1984: London (First Secretary)
1984–1985: Mexico (Counsellor)
1985–1988: MFA Brussels (Chef de Cabinet of the Minister for Foreign Trade, Deputy Secretary General of the Benelux EU)
1988–1992: Casablanca (Consul General)
1992–1996: Toronto (Consul General)
1996–1999: MFA Brussels (Director Central and Eastern European Desk, Director General of Foreign Economic Relations a.i., Deputy Director General of Bilateral Relations and Director of the European Desk).
1999–2004: Athens (Ambassador)
2004–2009: Madrid (Ambassador)
2009–2010: Vienna (Ambassador –bilateral Austria and Bosnia-Herzegovina- and Permanent Representative to the International Organizations in Vienna)
2010– MFA Brussels (Ambassador, Special Envoy for Asylum and Migration – from August 1, 2011).

During his stay in Bangkok, Ambassador Rijmenans was actively involved in the refugee crisis which followed the fall of Saigon and the Vietnamese invasion of Khmer Rouge Cambodia in 1978. He also had various contacts in Vientiane, Laos, after the Pathet Lao takeover.  On the multilateral level, he attended a series of ESCAP meetings, Belgium having an observer status in the organization. He helped organize an economic mission headed by the then Crown Prince Albert.

During his stay in London, Rijmenans dealt mainly with economic affairs (the early Thatcher reforms) and, on the multilateral level, with various commodities organizations based in London. He was chairman of the Council of the International Cocoa Organization (ICCO), chairman of the Executive Committee of the International Coffee Organization (ICO) and chairman of the International Rubber Study Group (IRSG).

In Mexico, he became Deputy Chief of Mission and dealt with the financial dossiers of the Belgian companies, insured by the Belgian equivalent of the German Hermes or French Coface, the Ducroire, that had been hit by the severe financial crisis that Mexico underwent. He also was instrumental in organizing the visit of the then Crown Prince Albert at the head of an important economic mission, aiming at restoring ties with the Mexican economic actors.

In Brussels, from 1985 to 1988, he became “Chef de Cabinet” of the Minister for Foreign Trade and dealt with the dossiers, which were, at the time, exclusively of Federal competence. He organized various missions, mainly in Asia, in Pakistan, Hong Kong, Korea, Thailand, Malaysia, Indonesia etc. In 1986, he became Deputy Secretary General of the Benelux Economic Union, based in Brussels. The Secretariat of the Benelux was given the responsibility of organizing the negotiations of the Schengen Agreement, which was signed between the Benelux, the FRG and France. Ambassador Rijmenans was thus heavily involved in these negotiations.

In Casablanca, from 1988 to 1992, he became Chief of Mission of an important Belgian Consular post, the Moroccan Community in Belgium being, by far, the most numerous non-European community in the country. Beyond his consular duties, he also promoted Belgian economic interests in Morocco, mainly in the textile and mining sectors. In 1991, he participated in the contingency evacuation planning within the European Community ad hoc coordination, in the context of the 1st Gulf War.

In Toronto, from 1992 to 1996, he covered as Consul General a jurisdiction stretching from Ontario to British Columbia, concentrating a large Belgian community. He had a close relationship with the Provincial authorities and promoted Belgian economic and cultural interests in Canada.

In Brussels, from 1996 to 1999, he became Director of the Central and Eastern European Desk, covering three main areas (Central Europe, the Balkans and the former USSR countries) and headed numerous missions, consultations and negotiations with these countries, concentrating on the countries seeking accession to the EU. In 1997, he was designated Director General of Foreign Economic Relation a.i., at a time when the Ministry for Foreign Affairs was undergoing a major restructuring. He was instrumental in creating the new Directorate General for Bilateral Relations (DGB), of which he became Deputy-Director General and Director of the European Desk in 1998.

In Athens, during his mission, from 1999 to 2004, the State visit of the King of the Belgians Albert II and Queen Paola took place in 2001. Belgium chaired the EU in 2001 and the Hellenic Republic in 2003. In 2004, the Olympic Games were organized in Athens, Jacques Rogge, a Belgian, being elected chairman of the IOC. These various events led to the planning and organization of numerous negotiations, meetings and visits of delegations.

In Madrid, from 2004 to 2009, he concentrated his efforts on creating a close working relationship on European Union issues and OSCE matters (Belgium chairing this organisation, its chairmanship being followed by Spain's)with the Spanish MFA. He consolidated the wide consular and economic network that Belgium maintains in Spain and organized a wide range of contacts, including working visits by the then Belgian PM, Mr. G. Verhofstadt. In his capacity as Ambassador to Andorra, He consolidated the relations between Belgium and the Principality.

In Vienna, from 2009 to 2010, he represented Belgium bilaterally towards Austria and Bosnia-Herzegovina, and multilaterally in the numerous international organisations, (the IAEA, UNODC etc.) He chaired the WEOG, was instrumental in the campaign for a Belgian candidature for the leadership of the AIEA, following closely non-proliferation issues.

As Ambassador, Special envoy for Asylum and Migration, he represented Belgium in the EU's High Level Working Group on Migration (HLWG), the General Forum on Development and Migration (GFMD), the Steering Group of the Rabat Process, and in charge of dossiers relating to the International Organisation for Migration (IOM) and the UNHCR. He coordinated the various Belgian actors active in these fora and is in charge of a range of bilateral dossiers within the scope of his competences.

Accolades 

Various Belgian and foreign distinctions: grand officer in the Order of Leopold II, commander in the Order of Leopold, commander in the Order of the Crown, Grand Cross in the Order of the Phoenix (Greece), commander in the Order of the Aztec Eagle (Mexico), etc.

He presented the "Concours diplomatique" of 1974, and was received as major of his promotion. Having completed his military duties, he entered the Belgian Diplomatic Service on January 1, 1975 as a trainee. During his traineeship, he was posted in The Hague in 1975.

References

1948 births
Living people
Diplomats from Rome
Belgian diplomats
Ambassadors of Belgium to Greece
Ambassadors of Belgium to Spain
Ambassadors of Belgium to Austria